Edward Burn King (1890 – after 1913) was an English professional footballer who played as a right half in the Football League for Clapton Orient and Woolwich Arsenal.

Personal life 
King served as a private in the Football Battalion, The Queen's (Royal West Surrey Regiment) and the Labour Corps during the First World War. After his retirement from football due to being wounded, he became a miner.

Career statistics

References

English footballers
English Football League players
Association football midfielders
Leyton Orient F.C. players
English miners
British Army personnel of World War I
Middlesex Regiment soldiers
Arsenal F.C. players
Leyton F.C. players
Southern Football League players
1890 births
People from Blyth, Northumberland
Footballers from Northumberland
Queen's Royal Regiment soldiers
South Shields F.C. (1889) players
Date of birth unknown
Year of death unknown
Military personnel from Northumberland

Royal Pioneer Corps soldiers